The Quirimbas Islands lie in the Indian Ocean off northeastern Mozambique, close to Pemba, the capital of the province of Cabo Delgado. The archipelago consists of about 32 islands, including Ibo, Matemo, Medjumbe, Quirimba, Metundo, Quisiva, Vamizi Island and Rolas Island all going up to the Tanzanian border.

History
Originally home to fishing settlements, the islands' population grew around Arab trading posts and throve under the Portuguese trading routes when it was known as the Ilhas de São Lázaro (Islands of St. Lazarus) during the 16th century. When the Portuguese started occupying cities in the islands such as Ibo, the Arab merchants fled to other parts of the island to operate in. The Arab merchants refused to trade with the Portuguese, in which started an attack resulting in 60 Muslim merchants casualties and property being burnt down. The island was in control by the Portuguese until Mozambique gained independence in 1975. Before independence, only four of the 32 islands were inhabited. Today, many of the islands are inhabited. On May 23, 2014, a mudspill was reported off shore near the Quirimbas Islands which was caused by a drilling rig operated by Anadarko Petroleum.

The park was established in 2002 as a protected area.

World Heritage Status
The Quirimbas Islands are currently on the tentative list for becoming a UNESCO World Heritage Site which was submitted in 2008.

Gallery

References

External links
 The Quirimbas Archipelago - UNESCO World Heritage Centre

 
Archipelagoes of Mozambique
East African coral coast
Geography of Cabo Delgado Province
Mozambique Channel
Southern Zanzibar–Inhambane coastal forest mosaic